Eric Lilavois (born April 7, 1979) is an American record producer, audio engineer, mixer, musician, and songwriter.

Lilavois produces a wide variety of musical acts and styles and has earned substantial production, engineering, and mixing credits. In addition to working in conjunction with Warner Bros Records, Atlantic, Framework/Universal (and more) to develop artists for their respective rosters, Lilavois has worked with the following artists in various capacities: 
 Saint Motel
 The Dustbowl Revival 
 Atlas Genius
 My Chemical Romance 
 Surfer Blood
 Smokey Brights
 Finish Ticket
 Risers 
 Givers and Takers
 Empire Theatre
 Island Apollo 
 Kyle Nicolaides (of Beware of Darkness)
 Celeigh Chapman
 Dan Zanes and The Harmony Project 
 Gabriel Wolfchild and The Northern Light (The Voice)
 The Complex Dialect
 and many, many more...

London Bridge Studio 
Lilavois is an owner of Seattle, Washington's London Bridge Studio, where countless multiplatinum records were recorded, Including Pearl Jam Ten, Mother Love Bone Shine, Soundgarden Louder Than Love, Alice In Chains Dirt, Macklemore and Ryan Lewis Downtown, Temple of The Dog,  Blind Melon, The Singles Motion Picture Soundtrack, Fleet Foxes, Cat Power, One Republic, Death Cab for Cutie, and more.

Crown City Studios 
Lilavois owned and operated Crown City Studios, a 4000 sq. ft recording studio in Pasadena, California, from 2005 until 2015, was the Executive Producer of the "Crown City Sessions" live video series, and engineered / mixed each episode which featured both established and up and coming buzz worthy artists.

Television / film 
In addition to producing and composing hundreds of original cues for television (including Pawn Stars, American Restoration, Cajun Pawn Stars, Counting Cars) Lilavois has earned engineering credits on several award-winning shorts and independent films (The Legend of Beaver Damn, Becoming Santa.).

The Days In Between 
Lilavois was the lead singer and guitarist of the Los Angeles-based Rock Band “The Days In Between” which toured the North and Southwest United States extensively between 2004 and 2006, and sold thousands of independently released records. According to the band's Facebook page, a large portion of the band's back catalog, will be re-released throughout 2017, including previously unreleased material, and a brand new EP.

Solo artist career 
Lilavois’ self-produced debut solo record “The Only Way” was released digitally worldwide  on January 11, 2011, followed up by his most recent effort “Salt, Sea, and Smoke.” Originally released as three separate EP's exclusively through Bandcamp, and now slated as a full-length album due in 2017. The album was accompanied by a documentary, The Journey; The Making of Salt, Sea, and Smoke, which was premiered at Laemmle's Playhouse 7 Theater  in Pasadena, California.

In the wake of the January 2010 Haiti earthquake disaster, Lilavois penned the single “Ayiti Cherie Memories”, recorded and released it as a digital single on iTunes worldwide to benefit UNICEF. Though Lilavois was born in the United States, both of his parents are Haitian.

Musician credits 
Musician credits on various records have included Vocals, Backing Vocals, Electric Guitar, Acoustic Guitar, Classical Guitar, Piano, Ebow, Banjo, Accordion, Percussion, Drums, Organ, Harmonica, Keyboards, Typewriter, and more.

Make Music Pasadena 
Lilavois has been a long time supporter of the west coast's largest free music festival and has filled many roles for the organization over the years, including curator, talent buyer, advisor, and MC (2013–2015) . Artists Lilavois booked for the festival include: How to Dress Well, Sir Sly, Hundred Waters, Forebear, Kaleo, Surfer Blood, Tennis, Saint Motel, Andy Allo, Moses Sumney, Wild Ones, Run River North, The Record Company, Edith Crash, Shelby Earl, Kid Cadaver, Jay Som, Dutch Party, and The Fontaines, among others.

Notes, contributions, and articles 
Lilavois is a frequent panelist at SXSW, has written guest columns for Performer Magazine, Artist Waves and spoken annually to students of the Creative Arts Agency STEAM program.

References 

American record producers
American rock musicians
Living people
1979 births